The women's 100 metres event at the 1978 Commonwealth Games was held on 6 and 7 August at the Commonwealth Stadium in Edmonton, Alberta, Canada.

Medalists

Results

Heats
Held on 6 August

Qualification: First 3 in each heat (Q) and the next 1 fastest (q) qualify for the semifinals.

Wind:Heat 1: -2.5 m/s, Heat 2: ? m/s, Heat 3: -1.6 m/s, Heat 4: -0.1 m/s, Heat 5: ? m/s

Semifinals
Held on 6 August

Qualification: First 4 in each semifinal (Q) qualify directly for the final.

Wind:Heat 1: 0.0 m/s, Heat 2: -0.8 m/s

Final
Held on 7 August

Wind: +2.9 m/s

References

Heats & Semifinals results (The Canberra Times)
Final results (The Canberra Times)
Australian results

Athletics at the 1978 Commonwealth Games
1978